Kai Walter Schoppitsch (born 2 May 1980 in Wolfsberg) is an Austrian football player currently playing for SV Austria Klagenfurt.

Career
Schoppitsch was raised in Klagenfurt, and began playing professional football with local side SK Austria Kärnten where he appeared in the Austrian Football Bundesliga. He also played in the Bundesliga for SC Rheindorf Altach before suffering a long-term injury in early 2008. He returned from his injury in the First League with First Vienna.

References

1980 births
Living people
Austrian footballers
FC Red Bull Salzburg players
SK Austria Kärnten players
SC Rheindorf Altach players
Association football midfielders